Salé-Tabriquet railway station is a train terminal administered by ONCF in the district of Tabriquet, in Salé, Morocco, serving the northern suburbs of the city. The station is the second train station in Salé in terms of traffic, after the Salé-City railway station.

During the COVID-19 pandemic in Morocco, the Moroccan National Railways Office decided to close Salé Tabriquet station starting from April 18, 2020

References

Railway stations in Morocco
Transport in Salé